State Route 255 (SR 255) is an east–west state route located in southeast Ohio. Its eastern terminus is at State Route 7 in the hamlet of Sardis, which is situated along the banks of the Ohio River.

History
SR 255 was commissioned in 1935 on the same alignment as it currently occupies. Paving of the route between SR 800 and the Little Muskingum River was completed between 1957 and 1959. The rest of the route was paved by 1961.

Major intersections

References

255
Transportation in Monroe County, Ohio